Bartolomeo Carducci (156014 November 1608) was an Italian painter, better known as Carducho, the Spanish corruption of his Italian patronymic.

Biography 
He was born in Florence, where he studied architecture and sculpture under Bartolomeo Ammanati, and painting under Federico Zuccari. He assisted Zuccari with the completion of The Last Judgment on the ceiling of the dome of Florence Cathedral. The latter master he accompanied to Madrid, where he painted the ceiling of the Escorial library, assisting also in the production of the frescos that adorn the cloisters of that noted palace. His brother, Vincenzo Carducci also aided in the work, and succeeded him as chief painter to King Philip III of Spain.

He died in Spain, where most of his works are to be found. Among the most celebrated of them is a Descent from the Cross, in the church of San Felipe el Real, in Madrid, now in The Prado, along with a Last Supper.   The Real Academia de Bellas Artes de San Fernando also owns a Penitent St. Jerome.  Bartolomeo with his brother Vincenzo painted the notable reliquary altarpieces of San Diego de Valladolid, 1604–1606, which are exhibited in Museo Nacional de Escultura Colegio de San Gregorio, in that city. Among his pupils was Francisco López.

Notes

References

External links
 

1560 births
1608 deaths
16th-century Italian painters
Italian male painters
17th-century Italian painters
Painters from Florence
16th-century Spanish painters
Spanish male painters
17th-century Spanish painters
Fresco painters